MUI, Mui, or mui may refer to:

Computing 
Magic User Interface, system to generate graphical user interface
Multilingual User Interface, Microsoft's technology and file name extension for multiple languages on a Windows system

Organizations 
Indonesian Ulema Council, Indonesian Muslim clerical body.
Muhammad University of Islam
MUI Group, Malayan United Industries.

Places 
 Mui (मुई), a village in Sawai Madhopur district, Rajasthan
Mui River in Ethiopia
Mui, Estonia, a village

People 
Kong Duen-yee, known as Mui Yee
Mei (surname), Chinese surname
Peter Mui, American fashion designer

Economics 
Matter Under Inquiry, a preliminary investigations by the US Securities and Exchange Commission
Men's underwear index, an economic index

Other uses 
mui, ISO 639 code for the Palembang language also known as Musi

See also 
 Muy (disambiguation)